Harold "Harry" George Devine (May 18, 1909 – April 29, 1998) was an American boxer who competed in the 1928 Summer Olympics.

He was born in New Haven, Connecticut and died in North Oxford, Massachusetts.

Amateur career
Devine was national AAU featherweight champion in 1928 and represented the United States in the 1928 Olympics in Amsterdam.  There he defeated Fausto Montefiori of Italy in the Second Round and Kaarlo Vakeva of Finland in the Third Round.  In the Semi-Final Round on August 10 he was beaten by Bep van Klaveren (who went on to take the Gold Medal) despite flooring Van Klaveren in the second round. Devine won the bronze medal in the featherweight class after winning the third place fight against Lucian Biquet.

1928 Olympic results
Below is the record of Harold Devine.  Devine was an American featherweight boxer who competed at the 1928 Amsterdam Olympics:

 Round of 32: bye
 Round of 16: defeated Fausto Montefiore (Italy) on points
 Quarterfinal: defeated Kaarlo Vakeva (Finland) on points
 Semifinal: lost to Bep van Klaveren (Netherlands) on points
 Bronze Medal Bout: defeated Lucian Biquet (Belgium) on points (was awarded bronze medal)

Pro career
As a professional, Devine was handicapped by being a southpaw who was avoided by other good fighters.  Hand injuries held him back and he lost twice on cut eyes.  Despite this he won the New England welterweight title in 1934 by defeating Werther Arcelli and defended it successfully against Pancho Villa of New Bedford, Massachusetts, before losing it to Frankie Britt.  In 1935 he went to Australia, where he suffered two severe setbacks and then retired from the ring.

References

 
 

1909 births
1998 deaths
Boxers from Connecticut
Featherweight boxers
Boxers at the 1928 Summer Olympics
Olympic bronze medalists for the United States in boxing
Sportspeople from New Haven, Connecticut
American male boxers
Medalists at the 1928 Summer Olympics